Twins Mission is a 2007 Hong Kong martial arts-action-comedy film directed by action choreographer Kong Tao-Hoi and starring  Sammo Hung, Gillian Chung, Charlene Choi and Wu Jing among others. The film is a bit of a spoof of the popularity and success of the Twins and leaves the audience with a cliffhanger ending.

Plot
An evil gang of twins hold up a train to steal a magical Tibetan artifact, the Heaven's Bead from 3 Lamas. This artifact has healing powers and is a highly desirable item. A battle ensues and the artifact is knocked from the hands of a parachuting villain into the bag of an unsuspecting passerby.

The passerby, oblivious, gets into his van and heads to Hong Kong. This is where the other set of twins come in; they are aided by the twin Laus and Uncle Luck as they try to get the Heaven's Bead back.

A secret mission takes place, in which the good twins infiltrate a high rise building in order to recover the item. Although they initially succeed, the artifact is then passed to the wrong twin. Happy, Lilian's sister, who is suffering from cancer is also kidnapped and held prisoner in the high-rise building.

The good twins eventually recover the Heaven's Bead and lose it again while rescuing Happy. The villains get away with the Heaven's Bead.

Cast
Gillian Chung as Pearl
Charlene Choi as Jade
Sammo Hung as Uncle Luck
Wu Jing as Lau Hay and Lau San
Yuen Wah as Chang Chung and Chang Yung
Jess Zhang as Lilian Li
Steven Cheung as Fred
Qiu Lier as Happy
Sek Sau as Professor Mok
Sam Lee as Officer Lam
Andy Liang as Wan Pau
Cody Liang as Wan Lung
Mona as Mona
Ammar as Ahao
Lisa as Lisa
Long Fei as Kitten
Long Ze as Puppy
Albert Leung as Iron Head
Herbert Leung as Bronze Head
Lam Ho as Marco
Lam Kit as Polo
Liang Yueyun as Miao Kam Fung
Bobby Yip as Miao Yam Fung
Chen Hao

External links
 

Hong Kong action comedy films
Hong Kong martial arts films
2007 science fiction action films
2007 films
2000s Cantonese-language films
Martial arts science fiction films
2000s Hong Kong films